2/12 may refer to:
1/6 (number), a fraction (one sixth)
February 12 (month-day date notation)
December 2 (day-month date notation)

See also
 12/2 (disambiguation)
 Schweizer SGS 2-12